The following lists events that happened during 2015 in the Republic of Malawi.

Incumbents
 President: Peter Mutharika 
 Vice-President: Saulos Chilima

Events
 January 14 - Heavy rains cause 48 deaths. About 70,000 lose their homes.
 January 16 - Flash floods cause at least 176 deaths. Over 110,000 people are driven from their homes.

References

 
Years of the 21st century in Malawi
2010s in Malawi
Malawi
Malawi